Fremont is an unincorporated community in Dickenson County, Virginia, in the United States.

History
A post office was established at Fremont in 1917, and remained in operation until it was discontinued in 1962. The community was named for John C. Frémont, an American explorer.

References

Unincorporated communities in Dickenson County, Virginia
Unincorporated communities in Virginia